Adiantum capillus-veneris, the Southern maidenhair fern, black maidenhair fern, maidenhair fern, and venus hair fern,  is a species of ferns in the genus Adiantum and the family Pteridaceae with a subcosmopolitan worldwide distribution. It is cultivated as a popular garden fern and houseplant.

Distribution
Adiantum capillus-veneris is native to the southern half of the United States from California to the Atlantic coast, through Mexico and Central America, to South America. It is also native to Eurasia, the Levant in Western Asia, and Australasia. There are two disjunct occurrences in the northern part of North America: at Cascade Springs in the Black Hills of South Dakota and Fairmont Hot Springs, British Columbia. In both instances, the warm microclimate created by hot mineral springs permits the growth of the plant far north of its normal range. It is similar in Zvonce spa resort (Звоначка Бања, Zvonačka Banja), near Pirot in Serbia, where hot mineral springs provide adequate heat and humidity for the survival of this species.

It is found in temperate climates from warm-temperate to tropical, where the moisture content is high but not saturating, in the moist, well-drained sand, loam or limestone of many habitats, including rainforests, shrub and woodlands, broadleaf and coniferous forests, and desert cliff seeps, and springs. It often may be seen growing on moist, sheltered and shaded sandstone or limestone formations, generally south-facing in the southern hemisphere, north-facing in the north, or in gorges. It occurs throughout Africa in moist places by streams. On moist sandstone cliffs it grows in full or partial shade, even when unprotected.

Description

Cultivation
Adiantum capillus-veneris  is cultivated and widely available around the world for planting in natural landscape native plants and traditional shade gardens, for outdoor container gardens, and commonly as an indoor houseplant.

Adiantum × mairisii is a winter hardy hybrid of Adiantum capillus-veneris with another species, which is likely to be one of Adiantum raddianum, Adiantum aethiopicum, or Adiantum cuneatum.

As a houseplant, Adiantum capillus-veneris  requires filtered light and very humid conditions. It should be grown in soil rich in organic matter and should be watered frequently but lightly, to keep the roots damp but not drenched. The temperature should not fall below . Is is propagated by dividing, making sure each clump has a section of rhizome.

Conservation
The fern is listed as an endangered species in North Carolina (as southern maidenhair-fern) and threatened species in Kentucky (as venus hair fern), due to loss of Appalachian habitat.

Uses
This plant is used medicinally by Native Americans. The Mahuna people use the plant internally for rheumatism, and the Navajo people of Kayenta, AZ use an infusion of the plant as a lotion for bumblebee and centipede stings. The Navajo people also smoke it or take it internally to treat mental illness.

In the traditional medicine of Iran, frond infusion of Adiantum capillus-veneris is used for jaundice therapy.

References

External links 

 Adiantum capillus-veneris - Southern maidenhair fern — U.C. Cal-Photo Gallery
 USDA Profile for Adiantum capillus-veneris (common maidenhair fern)
 
 U.C. Jepson Manual treatment for Adiantum capillus-veneris
 Adiantum capillus-veneris in the Canary Islands
 Chrono.uk: Spore-pollen studies
  Lady Bird Johnson Wildflower Center - Horticultural Growing Conditions and Propagation

capillus-veneris
Ferns of the Americas
Ferns of Australasia
Ferns of Europe
Ferns of Asia
Plants described in 1753
Taxa named by Carl Linnaeus
Plants used in traditional Native American medicine
Garden plants of North America
Garden plants of Asia
Garden plants of Europe
House plants